Strigiphilus is a genus of chewing louse in the suborder Ischnocera. It was circumscribed in 1910 by Eric Mjöberg.

Taxonomic history
Mjöberg initially circumscribed Strigiphilus as a subgenus of the genus he referred to as Docophorus (now known as Philopterus).

In a 1966 paper, Theresa Clay recognized 29 species and grouped them into the following nine species groups:
 Strigiphilus rostratus  group 
 Strigiphilus heterocerus  group
 Strigiphilus cursor  group
 Strigiphilus crenulatus  group
 Strigiphilus macrogenitalis  group
 Strigiphilus strigis  group 
 Strigiphilus siamensis  group 
 Strigiphilus ketupae  group 
 Strigiphilus cursitans  group

The largest group is the S. curstans group.

Hosts
Strigiphilus is the only genus of Ischnocera to exclusively parasitize owls.

Species
, there are approximately fifty species of Strigiphilus. Species include:

 Strigiphilus garylarsoni  (cursitans group)

References

Further reading

 
 

Lice
Parasites of birds